Bill Lokan (born 1 October 1959) is a former Australian rules footballer who played with North Adelaide in the South Australian National Football League (SANFL) and Fitzroy in the Victorian Football League (VFL).

Lokan, who played his junior football in Walkerville, won a reserves best and fairest at North Adelaide in 1978, despite playing only 13 games. In 1979 he was promoted to the seniors, where he remained for four seasons. He made a total of 51 league appearances for North Adelaide.

A centreman, Lokan joined Fitzroy in 1983 and played 87 games for the club in six seasons, including five finals.
Lokan, now resides in the Clare Valley as a school teacher for year seven at St Joseph's Primary.

References

External links
 
 

1959 births
Australian rules footballers from South Australia
Fitzroy Football Club players
North Adelaide Football Club players
Living people